The Amazon Labor Union (ALU) is an independent labor union specifically for Amazon workers, created on April 20, 2021. On April 1, 2022, the Amazon workers at a warehouse in Staten Island, JFK8, backed by the ALU became the first unionized Amazon workers recognized by the National Labor Relations Board.

History 

The Amazon Labor Union was founded on April 20, 2021 by a labor-activist group founded by Chris Smalls called The Congress of Essential Workers (TCOEW). Smalls, along with Derrick Palmer, had organized a walkout at the JFK8 facility to protest Amazon's handling of the COVID-19 pandemic, which had led to the firing of Smalls. Smalls' termination was widely criticized by government officials, and prompted Smalls to form TCOEW and lead a number of strike actions.

Learning from the 2020 Bessemer union drive at an Amazon facility in Alabama, which initially resulted in a now-challenged vote against unionizing, Smalls concluded that he should lead a grassroots movement to organize the ALU after assessing the attacks Amazon made against the Retail, Wholesale and Department Store Union during the Bessemer drive. Smalls explained his decision, saying to The Guardian "If established unions had been effective, they would have unionized Amazon already. We have to think about 21st century-style unionizing. It's how do we build up the workers' solidarity."
Over 50 Amazon warehouses contacted the ALU in attempts to organize their own workplaces, with some facilities from Canada, India, South Africa and the United Kingdom asking the ALU for assistance.

Leadership 
 President: Chris Smalls
 Vice president of organizing: Derrick Palmer

Membership

JFK8 warehouse 
Over a five-day period between March 25 and 30, 2022, workers voted for unionizing the JFK8 warehouse in Staten Island. On April 1, 2022, the ballot count concluded with 2,654 in favor of unionizing and 2,131 voting against, officially resulting with the creation of the Amazon Labor Union as the first independent Amazon union in the United States. The New York Times described the unionization as "one of the biggest victories for organized labor in a generation" and Jacobin wrote that the ALU's achievement was "the most important labor victory in the United States since the 1930s". President Joe Biden congratulated the union, with Press Secretary Jen Psaki stating he was "glad to see workers ensure their voices are heard" and that Biden "believes firmly that every worker in every state must have a free and fair choice to join a union". Amazon submitted an objection to the NLRB, asking for a new election. The company claimed that members of the Union "intimidated employees", "recorded voters in the polling place" and "distributed marijuana to employees in exchange for their support", according to an excerpt from the complaint.

On 11 January 2023, the regional director of the NLRB rejected numerous objections and certified the Amazon Labor Union as the exclusive representative for "all hourly full-time and regular-part time fulfillment center associates employed at the Employer’s JFK8 building". Reviews and appeals were expected to continue.

LDJ5 warehouse 
On March 2, 2022, the NLRB approved a union election at the second of the four New York City warehouses, LDJ5.

On May 2, 2022, the workers voted 618 to 380 against a union, with 1,600 employees eligible for the vote.

See also 
 REI worker organization
 Starbucks unions
 Apple worker organizations

References

External links 
 
 Amazon Labor Union Twitter account

2021 establishments in New York City
Amazon (company)
History of Staten Island
History of labor relations in the United States
Organizations based in New York City
Strikes during the COVID-19 pandemic in the United States
Trade unions established in 2021
Trade unions in New York (state)
Working-class culture in New York City